Michele Canova Iorfida is an Italian record producer, arranger, songwriter and engineer. Since 2003, Iorfida has been responsible for more than 18 million album sales worldwide. His work with artists including Jovanotti, Tiziano Ferro, and Giusy Ferreri has resulted in 7 Diamond, 15 Multi Platinum, and 10 Platinum FIMI certifications

In December 2012, Canova signed to Sony ATV worldwide publishing as a songwriter. In 2013, he moved to Los Angeles to build out a second music studio in North Hollywood, focusing on his career in the United States.

As a songwriter in Italy, he has worked alongside Jovanotti, Tiziano Ferro, Fabri Fibra, Giorgia, Dark Polo Gang, and Fedez, topping the Italian single charts (according to Nielsen).

He has also produced tracks in the United States featuring artists such as John Legend, Alicia Keys, Olly Murs and Kelly Rowland.

His production credits include work with Italian artists such as Tiziano Ferro (all albums), Jovanotti (Buon Sangue, Safari, Ora), Eros Ramazzotti (songs on 9, Calma Apparente, E2, and Ali e Radici), Fabri Fibra (Controcultura: Vip in trip, Tranne te, Qualcuno Normale, Le donne), Giorgia (Dietro le apparenze), Biagio Antonacci, Giusy Ferreri (Gaetana and Fotografie), Adriano Celentano, Max Pezzali, Loredana Errore, Gianni Morandi, and Latin artists such as Ha ash (4 songs on A tiempo in 2011).

Album Highlights (Italy)

Song Highlights (United States)

Album Highlights (Spanish)

Appearances

Waves Audio 
SoundGrid in the Studio: Amazing Hybrid Studio Tour (2018)

Plugin Alliance 
Michele Canova Iorfida – Artist Focus (2017)

Pensado's Show 
Michele's Studio Tour – Into the Lair #161 (2017)

Producer Michele Iorfida – Pensado's Place #303 (2017)

Produce like a Pro 
Dave Pensado Interview & Fab Factory Studio Tour – Warren Huart: Produce Like a Pro (2018)

TEDxCortina 
Michele Canova – Produttore musicale e CEO di Canova LLC

Canova was a speaker at TedxCortina 2018, speaking about the connections between Music & Technology.

Awards and nominations 
Canova is the recipient of several awards since becoming active in 2003:

2007: Won Top Grossing Record of the Year, Tiziano Ferro's Nessuno è solo', Italy

2008: Won Top Grossing Record of the Year, Jovanotti's 'Safari, Italy

2009: Won Top Grossing Record of the Year, Italy, Tiziano Ferro's 'Alla mia età', Italy

2012: Won Top Grossing Record of the Year, Italy, Tiziano Ferro's 'L'amore e' una cosa semplice', Italy

2013: Nominated for 2 Latin Grammys (one with Tiziano Ferro, one with Miguel Bosé)

2015: Won Top Grossing Record of the Year, Jovanotti's 'Lorenzo' (2nd place with Tiziano Ferro's 'Best of TZN', 5th place with Marco Megoni's 'Parole in Circolo', and 8th place with Marco Mengoni's 'Le cose che non-ho'), Italy

Awards (w/ Tiziano Ferro) 

World Music Awards
2010: Italian best-selling male of the year 2009

MTV Europe Music Awards

2004: Miglior artista italiano
2006: Miglior artista italiano

TRL Awards – MTV Italia

2007: Man of the year
2007: Best riempi-piazza
2008: Man of the year

Wind Music Awards

2007: Premio per l'album Nessuno è solo
2009: Premio per l'album Alla mia età
2010: Premio per il DVD Alla mia età – Live in Rome

Kids' Choice Awards
2006: Miglior cantante italiano
2007: Miglior cantante italiano

Other awards
2002: Premio Italiano della Musica come Artista rivelazione del 2001
2002: Miglior artista uomo al Festival di San Marino
2002: Miglior album Rosso relativo al Festival di San Marino
2002: Miglior Artista Esordiente al Festivalbar
2004: Premios Oye! come Miglior cantante Pop Latino maschile con l'album 111 Ciento once
2004: Billboard Latin Music Awards come miglior brano Pop Latino dell'anno con il brano Alucinado
2007: Giffoni Teen Award come personaggio italiano della musica
2009: Premio Videoclip Italiano come Miglior video dell'anno – categoria artista uomo con il videoclip Il regalo più grande
2010: Premio Dial 2009 come miglior canzone dell'anno in Spagna con il brano El regalo màs grande
2010: Italian Best-Selling Male Artist of the Year 2009 ai World Music Awards

Un-assignet awards
2002: Nomination al Premio Italiano della Musica (PIM) come Canzone italiana dell'anno con il brano Xdono
2002: Nomination agli MTV Europe Music Awards come Miglior artista italiano
2002: Nomination agli Italian Music Awards come Miglior album con Rosso relativo
2002: Nomination agli Italian Music Awards come Miglior artista maschile
2002: Nomination agli Italian Music Awards come Miglior singolo con Rosso relativo
2003: Nomination ai Latin Grammy Awards come Miglior esordiente, con Rosso relativo
2004: Nomination ai Billboard Latin Music Awards come Miglior album dell'anno Rojo relativo
2005: Nomination agli MTV Latin Music Awards come Miglior artista italiano
2005: Nomination ai Mexican Grammy Awards come Miglior artista maschile
2006: Nomination agli MTV Europe Music Awards come Miglior artista italiano
2006: Nomination al Premios Orgullosamente Latino come Video Latino dell'anno con il brano Mi credo
2006: Nomination al Premios Orgullosamente Latino come Canzone Latina dell'anno con il brano Mi credo
2006: Nomination al Premios Orgullosamente Latino come Gruppo Latino dell'anno (Tiziano Ferro e Pepe Aguilar)
2006: Nomination agli MTV Latin Music Awards come Miglior solista
2007: Nomination al Premios Orgullosamente Latino come solista dell'anno
2007: Nomination al Premios Orgullosamente Latino come canzone Latina dell'anno
2008: Nomination al Premios Orgullosamente Latino come solista dell'anno

External links
 https://web.archive.org/web/20121217044813/http://albumcredits.com/kaneepa
 :it:Categoria:Album certificati disco di diamante in Italia

References

Living people
Italian record producers
Italian audio engineers
Place of birth missing (living people)
Musicians from Milan
1972 births